Lassaba is a genus of moths in the family Geometridae erected by Frederic Moore in 1888.

Species
Lassaba acribomena (Prout, 1928)
Lassaba albidaria (Walker, 1866)
Lassaba brevipennis (Inoue, 1978)
Lassaba contaminata Moore, 1888
Lassaba fuliginosa (Inoue & Sato, 1986)
Lassaba hsuhonglini Fu & Sato, 2010
Lassaba indentata Warren, 1896
Lassaba nikkonis (Butler, 1881)
Lassaba parvalbidaria (Inoue, 1978)
Lassaba tayulingensis (Sato, 1986)
Lassaba vinacea (Prout, 1926)

References

Boarmiini